Cullen railway station was a railway station that served the small fishing village of Cullen, close to Portknockie in Moray. The railway station was opened by the Great North of Scotland Railway (GNoSR) on its Moray Firth coast line in 1886, served by Aberdeen to Elgin trains.

In 1923 the GNoSR became part of the London and North Eastern Railway and at nationalisation in 1948 became part of British Railways. The station and line was recommended for closure by Dr Beeching's report "The Reshaping of British Railways" and closed on 6 May 1968.

History

Background
In 1881 the Great North of Scotland Railway put a bill to parliament to extend its Portsoy line along the Moray Firth as far as  Buckie. In 1882 the Great North of Scotland applied for permission to build a  line from Portsoy following the coast to Buckie and then running on to Elgin.

Great North of Scotland Railway
The GNoSR station opened as 'Cullen' on 1 May 1886 with the central section of the coast line, served by through Aberdeen to Elgin trains. In 1923 the Great North of Scotland Railway was absorbed by the  London and North Eastern Railway. This was nationalised in 1948, and services provided by British Railways. The station and line was recommended for closure by Dr Beeching's in his report "The Reshaping of British Railways" and closed on 6 May 1968.

Services
The GNoSR station was served by through trains running between Aberdeen and Elgin. There were no Sunday services.

The station infrastructure
Cullen station had a single curved platform with the typical wooden style of station building, however it was larger than many of the others with a central canopy between two wings. a passing loop was not provided. The 1902 OS map shows a weighing machine in the goods yard, several sidings and a goods shed. A station agent's or stationmaster's cottage sat near to the station.

The line was predominantly single track apart from a double track section between Buckie and Portessie. Track lifting took place shortly after closure in 1968.

The Cullen viaducts
Cullen viaduct (NJ 50623 67213) is a category B listed structure with eight arches, built to carry a single track, constructed in 1884 and approached by substantial embankments. It was "designed around hollow masonry piers founded on concrete bases up to 20 feet (6.1m) below ground level, the limestone blocks being filled with rubble. The arches were built of red bricks set in cement with a ring of ashlar on each side, while the parapets were of blue limestone with a freestone capping." P M Barnett was the engineer responsible, such structures being made necessary by the refusal to permit the railway on an easier access through the Seafield Estate's property. To the east a single arch bridge survives, a four arch viaduct and finally another four-arched bridge. These structures were saved from demolition and now form part of a cycle route.

Station remnants
The station was demolished and the site is occupied by housing, however the Cullen railway viaducts were saved from demolition.

Moray Cycle Route
Much of the trackbed of the old railway now forms the Moray Cycle Route.

References

Footnotes

Sources

External links
RAILSCOT on Moray Coast Railway
Photograph of Cullen station on Flickr

Former Great North of Scotland Railway stations
Disused railway stations in Moray
Railway stations in Great Britain opened in 1886
Railway stations in Great Britain closed in 1968
Beeching closures in Scotland